Antoine Benoist (24 February 1632, Joigny – 8 April 1717) was a French painter and sculptor who served as personal painter to King Louis XIV. He was accepted as a member of the Académie Royale, Paris in 1681.

Benoist's fame grew after he exhibited forty-three wax figurines of the French Royal Circle at his residence in Paris. Thereafter, the king authorized the figurines to be shown throughout France. His work became so highly regarded that James II of England invited him to visit England in 1684. There he executed works of the English king and members of his royal court.

Today, Antoine Benoist's work can be viewed among the collections of the Bibliothèque Nationale in Paris and the Château de Versailles.

References
 Benoist-Charleville Family Papers, 1739–1949, Missouri Historical Society Archives
 Histoire des grandes familles françaises du Canada : ou Aperçu sur le chevalier Benoist et quelques familles contemporaines, Daniel, François, 1867
 Grove Dictionary of Art
 Ann Gulbransen's genealogy site, www.gulbangi.com – All material used by permission
 John F. Benoist family documents

External links
 Missouri Historical Society Archives, Benoist-Charleville Family Papers 
 Ann Gulbransen's genealogy site 
 Portrait of Louis XIV by Benoist, Château de Versailles 

1632 births
1717 deaths
People from Joigny
17th-century French painters
French male painters
18th-century French painters
17th-century French sculptors
French male sculptors
18th-century French sculptors
18th-century French male artists